The black-chinned emperor tamarin (Saguinus imperator imperator) is one of the two subspecies of the emperor tamarin. Unlike the bearded emperor tamarin, it has no beard. It is distributed throughout the rainforests of Brazil, Peru, and Bolivia. Not much on its conservation is known, so it is listed as Data Deficient by the IUCN. After a gestation period of 140–145 days, females usually give birth to one or two young. It is the same size as the emperor tamarin and it eats almost the same food: bugs, spiders, fruit, tree sap, and nectar.

References

 Rylands, A.B. & Mittermeier, R.A. 2008.  Saguinus imperator ssp. imperator. The IUCN Red List of Threatened Species 2008: e.T19827A9020706. . Retrieved 21 February 2016.

External links
Black-chinned Emperor Tamarin
Emperor Tamarin

emperor tamarin, black-chinned
Mammals of Bolivia
Mammals of Brazil
Mammals of Peru
black-chinned emperor tamarin
Subspecies